Khajeh Abdollah-e Ansari Metro Station is a station in line 3 of the Tehran Metro. It is located next to the interchange of Sayyad Expressway with Khajeh Abdollah Ansari Street and Resalat Expressway.

References

Tehran Metro stations
Railway stations opened in 2016
2015 establishments in Iran